Shrivenham F.C. is a football club based in Shrivenham, an Oxfordshire village, near Swindon, England.

The club also run a development side, Shrivenham Development, who compete in the Uhlsport Hellenic League 2 South.

History
They were established in 1900 and joined the Hellenic League Division One West in 2001 from the North Berks League, having won it for a second time in the 2000–01 season. They were Division One West Champions in 2004–05 and were promoted to the Hellenic League Premier Division. In the 2017-18 Hellenic League season they were promoted to the Hellenic Premier Division finishing 2nd after Easington Sports failed to beat Letcombe, losing 5-3.  Despite a poor start in their return season, the club went on to record a 17-game unbeaten run post Christmas and eventually finished the campaign in a club record 5th place.

Ground

Shrivenham play their home games at Barrington Park, Highworth Road, Shrivenham, Oxfordshire, SN6 8BJ.

Club honours

Hellenic League Division One West:
 Winners: 2004–05
 Runners Up 2017-18 (Promoted)
North Berks League:
 Winners: 1997–98 & 2000–01
North Berks League Division Two:
 Winners: 1994–95

Club records

Highest league position: 5th in Hellenic League Premier Division 2018–19
FA Cup best performance: First qualifying round 2009–10
FA Vase best performance: Fourth round 2007–08

Former players
1. Players that have played/managed in the football league or any foreign equivalent to this level (i.e. fully professional league).
2. Players with full international caps.
3. Players that hold a club record.
 Tom Jones (2003–2004)

References

External links
Official club website

Association football clubs established in 1900
1900 establishments in England
Football clubs in Oxfordshire
Football clubs in England
North Berks Football League
Hellenic Football League